Love Beyond Frontier (Love Beyond Frontier – ) is a 2019 Thai television series remake of the 2008 lakorn with the same title, Love Beyond Frontier, starring Perawat Sangpotirat (Krist), Tipnaree Weerawatnodom (Namtan), Thitipoom Techaapaikhun (New) and Ramida Jiranorraphat (Jane).

Directed by Worrawech Danuwong and produced by GMMTV together with Lasercat Studio, the series was one of the thirteen television series for 2019 launched by GMMTV in their "Wonder Th13teen" event on 5 November 2018. It premiered on GMM 25 and LINE TV on 12 May 2019, airing on Sundays at 20:10 ICT and 22:00 ICT, respectively. The series concluded on 4 August 2019.

Cast and characters 
Below are the cast of the series:

Main 
 Perawat Sangpotirat (Krist) as Wang
 Tipnaree Weerawatnodom (Namtan) as Pat
 Thitipoom Techaapaikhun (New) as Win
 Ramida Jiranorraphat (Jane) as Ple

Supporting 
 Penpak Sirikul (Tai) as Rose
 Apasiri Nitibhon (Um) as Pa
 Leo Saussay as Phu
 Jirawat Wachirasarunpat (Wo) as Bo
 Nachat Juntapun (Nicky) as an agent
 Praeploy Oree as a nurse
 Sumet Ong as Chuang, Pat's father

Soundtrack

References

External links 
 Love Beyond Frontier on GMM 25 website 
 Love Beyond Frontier on LINE TV
 
 GMMTV

Television series by GMMTV
Thai romantic comedy television series
Thai drama television series
2019 Thai television series debuts
2019 Thai television series endings
GMM 25 original programming
Television series by Lasercat